Camille Janssen (5 December 1837–18 April 1926) was a Belgian colonial civil servant and lawyer who held the position of Governor-General of the Congo Free State from 1886 to 1892. His son, Georges Janssen, would become head of the National Bank of Belgium.

Further reading

External links
Janssen, Camille at Biographie Coloniale Belge

1837 births
1926 deaths
Governors-General of the Congo Free State
Lawyers from Liège
University of Liège alumni